Karbi-Meghalaya plateau is, in fact, an extension of the main Indian peninsular plateau and are originally two different plateaus - Karbi Anglong Plateau and Meghalaya plateau.

The Meghalaya plateau is traditionally divided into Garo, Khasi and Jaintia Hills. The region from the river Dhansiri in the east to the Singimari River on the west is about 400 km long with an average width of about 40 km, covering about 35, 291 km2.

Karbi Plateau  is pear-shaped and has an area of about 7000 km2. Its link with the Meghalaya plateau proper is towards the south through a patch of highly denuded and subdued senile terrain.

Details
It is believed that due to the force exerted by the northeastward movement of the Indian plate at the time of the Himalayan origin, a huge fault was created between the Rajmahal hills and the Karbi-Meghalaya plateau. Later, this depression was filled up by the depositional activity of numerous rivers. Today the Maghalaya and Karbi Anglong plateau remains detached from the main Peninsular block.  This area receives maximum rainfall from the South-West monsoon. It is located in the north eastern plateau of India.

References
 

Plateaus of India
Landforms of Assam